Henan Normal University, colloquially known as 河师大, is a public normal university located in the northern part of Xinxiang, Henan, China. In 2022, Henan Normal University ranked the 3rd in Henan province and top 150 in China. Henan Normal University owns one of the largest education institution in China. In addition to the university, it contains attached kindergartners, one primary school and one National Key Middle-high school.

History 
Henan Normal University is one of the key universities directly under the provincial government, developed from the School of Science of Henan University (founded in 1923) and Pingyuan Teachers college (founded in 1951). Due to the adjustment of colleges and departments, the university was formerly named as Henan Teachers Normal College 2, Henan Second Teachers College and Xinxiang Teachers College after the founding of People's Republic of China. And in 1985 it was changed to the current name.
 
In August, 1948, Pingyuan Province was set up. To meet the needs of construction, the government decided to establish a new university, presently named Pingyuan University. In March, 1951, the university was named Pingyuan Teachers College, being approved by Central Ministry of Education. Pingyuan Teachers College held a grand school-opening ceremony on November 23, 1951. The college had 4 departments with 7 specialities, 485 students, 181 faculty and staff, 83 teachers of whom are more than 10 professors.

In August, 1953, Pingyuan Teachers College and Henan University in Kaifeng merged into Henan Teachers Normal College with the two colleges being run separately. College 1 which was merged liberal arts of former Henan University and Pingyuan Teachers College run in Kaifeng. College 2 which merged science departments of former Hennan University and Pingyuan Teachers Normal College run in Xinxiang. College 2 had 4 departments including mathematics, physics, chemistry, biology. It became the pure science normal college after being regulated. College 2 was renamed Hennan Second Teachers College and Xinxiang Teachers College according to department-speciality adjusting spirit of the colleges and universities of State Council afterwards.

From 1956 to 1965, the university developed rapidly and enrolled totally 6,708 students, of whom 6,007 graduated. It fostered a great number of qualified talents and supported the national economic construction. But in the ten-year Cultural Revolution (1966–1976), the university was seriously destroyed. After “Gang of Four” was crushed in 1976, especially after the Third Plenary Session of the Eleventh Central Committee of CPC, the university began to walk onto a development road through bringing out of chaos and carrying out a series of development and reform work.

From 1975, the university recovered liberal arts and entered the building and developing commonly period of liberal arts and science department, but the science department was taken as the dominant factor in the sides of department offered. To fit in with Henan’s economic and educational situations and meet the needs of talents, Xinxiang Teachers College was renamed Henan Normal University in June 1985. So far it has become a comprehensive normal university with bigger scale, varied form and complete subjects and courses.

References

http://www.htu.cn/english/about1.htm

External links
Official website of Henan Normal University  (Chinese)
Official website of Henan Normal University (English)

Universities and colleges in Henan
Teachers colleges in China
Educational institutions established in 1923
Xinxiang
1923 establishments in China